Nam phrik ong is a popular Thai food in Northern Thailand. It is often paired with sticky rice, pork and fresh vegetables such as cucumber, lentils, Chinese cabbage etc.

Ingredients and preparation 
Nam phrik ong is made from ground pork, and may contain sugar, tomato, and shrimp paste. The chili paste typically includes dried chili, salt, garlic, lemongrass, water and shrimp paste, all of which is pounded in a mortar. The cooked ground pork is mixed with the chili paste in the mortar, with some water added if too dry, and it is typically served with an assortment of fresh seasonal vegetables.

See also
 List of pork dishes

References 
Thai Food Master, Thai Northern Style Pork and Tomato Relish, April 30, 2010
thaifoodmaster น้ำพริกอ่อง, น้ำพริกอ่อง, retrieve 2016-06-04
oknation

Northern Thai cuisine